Kyun-Tas is a mountain range in the Sakha Republic, Far Eastern Federal District, Russia.

The Kyun-Tas is one of the mountain areas of Yakutia where there are kigilyakh rock formations.

Geography
It rises at the southern limit of the Yana-Indigirka Lowland, northwest of the Aby Lowland. 
It is a broad massif with mountains of middle height and smooth slopes. 

Although the range is smaller, the highest summits of the Kyun-Tas are higher than those of the neighboring Polousny Range.

Hydrography

See also
Kigilyakh

References

External links
Regional populations and migration of moose in northern Yakutia, Russia.

Mountain ranges of the Sakha Republic

ceb: Khrebet Kyuntas
sah:Күн Таас